The 2008–09 Kent State Golden Flashes men's basketball team represented Kent State University in the 2008–09 college basketball season. The team was coached by Geno Ford and played their home games in the Memorial Athletic and Convocation Center. They are members of the Mid-American Conference. They finished the season 19–15, 10–6 in MAC play.

Roster

Schedule and results
Source: 

|-
!colspan=9 style=| Regular season

|-
!colspan=9 style=| 2009 MAC tournament

|-
!colspan=9 style=| 2009 CIT

References 

Kent State Golden Flashes men's basketball seasons
Kent State Golden Flashes
Kent State
Kent State
Kent State